The Lederstrumpfbrunnen (literally: leatherstocking fountain) is a fountain in the German city of Edenkoben. It commemorates the frontiersman Johann Adam Hartmann (1748-1836), who was born in  this city and considered by some as a possible inspiration for the character Natty Bumppo of the Leatherstocking Tales novels by the American writer James Fenimore Cooper.

The three main sculptures around the fountain are Hartman/Bumppo depicted as a hunter with a rifle and accompanied by a dog, the Indian chief Chingachgook (another famous character from the novels) and the artist Max Slevogt (1868-1932), who created some of the best known illustrations for the German editions of the novels.

The fountain was designed between 1987 and 1990 by the German sculptor Gernot Rumpf.

Notes

External links 

Lederstrumpfbrunnen in Edenkoben

Bronze sculptures in Germany
1990 sculptures
Fountains in Germany
Sculptures of men in Germany
Sculptures of Native Americans
Works by German people